Geophilus virginiensis is a species of soil centipede in the family Geophilidae found in Virginia. It grows up to 50 millimeters in length, has 49–57 leg pairs, and is tawny yellow in color.

Taxonomy
G. virginiensis is often confused with G. ampyx and considered by some to be a form of G. mordax, differentiated only by the presence of lateral coxopleural pores on the ultimate legs and variation in color. There's debate as to whether or not G. virginiensis is a valid species.

References 

virginiensis
Animals described in 1889
Taxa named by Charles Harvey Bollman